Copperhead was an American rock and roll group founded by guitarist John Cipollina, after leaving the band Quicksilver Messenger Service in 1970.

Copperhead originally consisted of Cipollina on lead guitar, Gary Phillips on vocals and second guitar and organ, Jim McPherson on vocals, piano and bass, Pete Sears on piano and bass, and David Weber on drums. Copperhead was originally signed to the Just Sunshine recording label but, in 1972, (Sears left to fly back to England and record with Rod Stewart and play in a band with Nicky Hopkins; bassist Hutch Hutchinson replaced him) it was signed to a major-label record deal by Clive Davis at Columbia Records and recorded its debut album entitled, Copperhead, released in 1973.  The first album was a commercial failure, and Columbia refused to release their second album and Copperhead disbanded.

References

External links
iTunes
Copperhead discography

Rock music groups from New York (state)
Columbia Records artists
Musical groups established in 1970
Musical quartets
Rock and roll music groups